Yalta Sea Commercial Port is a commercial seaport in the city of Yalta, Ukraine, on the Black Sea coast of Crimea. The port is originally subordinated to the Black Sea Shipping Company, now Ukrmorrichflot. Yalta sea trade port carries out transportation and processing of cargoes, and serves passengers in sailing abroad and in small cabotage.

See also

List of ports in Ukraine
Transport in Ukraine
Cargo turnover of Ukrainian ports

References

Companies established in 1833
Buildings and structures in Crimea
Ports of Crimea
Enterprises of Yalta
Sanctioned due to Russo-Ukrainian War
Transport in Yalta
1833 establishments in Ukraine
1833 in Yalta